This is a list of all political parties eligible and intending to contest the Turkish general election of June 2015. Parties wishing to contest were required to send a full list of their candidates to the Supreme Electoral Council of Turkey by 17:00 local time on April 7th, 2015. 20 of the 32 eligible parties submitted candidate lists. A full list of all political parties in Turkey is available here.

Parties eligible
On 1 February, the Supreme Electoral Council of Turkey announced that 32 parties fit the criteria in order to field candidates in the general election. In order to be eligible, parties need to have formed local organisations at least six months before the election and have completed their party congresses by the election. Furthermore, they need local party offices in at least half of the 81 Provinces of Turkey. The eligible parties who are intending to contest the election by fielding partisan candidates are listed as follows.

Parties fielding candidates
Parties that intended to contest the election were required to hand their candidate lists to the Supreme Electoral Council of Turkey (YSK) by 5pm local time on 7 April. 20 parties presented candidate lists before the deadline, while another, the First Party, was delayed by 22 minutes due to a traffic accident. The parties are listed below according to their position on the ballot paper.

The number of electoral districts in which the party is fielding candidates is shown in brackets after the party's name.

Parties contesting as independents
Since the parliamentary threshold of 10% does not apply to independent candidates, parties who poll significantly below the threshold may contest the election by fielding their candidates as independents in order to increase their chances of getting elected. This was a tactic employed by Kurdish nationalist parties during the 2007 and 2011 election. In the latter, the Peace and Democracy Party candidates won 5.67% of the vote and 35 were elected since they contested the election as independents and rejoined the BDP shortly after taking their seats.

The following parties have expressed intention of fielding independent candidates for the election.

Electoral alliances
The following electoral alliances were made between parties in the run-up to the election.
The Labour Party (EMEP) announced support for the Peoples' Democratic Party (HDP) and did not contest the election.
The Great Union Party (BBP) and the Felicity Party (SP) announced that they would contest the election as a joint alliance under the name National Alliance (Millî İttifak). The Nation and Justice Party (MİLAD) planned to join the SP and BBP, but it did not actualise. The candidate lists were drawn up such that BBP candidates were placed top in electoral districts in which they won more votes than the SP in 2011, while SP candidates were placed top in provinces in which the SP had beaten the BBP in 2011. This meant that an SP candidate was placed first in 55 provinces, while a BBP candidate was placed first in 30. The remaining positions subsequently alternated between SP and BBP candidates.
Two minor parties, namely the Revolutionary People's Party (DHP) and Socialist Workers' Party of Turkey (TSİP) backed the Republican People's Party (CHP).
The Conservative Ascension Party (MYP) announced support for the Nationalist Movement Party (MHP).

The True Path Party (DYP) expressed its intention to form an alliance with six other parties in order to overcome the 10% election threshold. The party's leader Çetin Özaçıkgöz met with the leaders of the Centre Party, Rights and Equality Party (HEPAR) and the Great Union Party (BBP). In the end, no alliance was formed.

References

June 2015 Turkish general election